Florus may refer to:
 Gessius Florus, Roman governor of Judaea from 64 to 66
 Lucius Annaeus Florus, Roman historian
 Publius Annius Florus, Roman poet and rhetorician
 Florus of Lodève, legendary first bishop of Lodève
 Florus of Lyon, ecclesiastical writer
 Florus and Laurus, Christian martyrs

See also